Cholpon-Ata Airport (Kyrgyz: Чолпон-Ата аэропорту, Russian: Чолпон-Атинский аэропорт)  is an airport serving a resort town of Cholpon-Ata in the Issyk Kul Province (oblast) of Kyrgyzstan. The Russian IATA code for Cholpon-Ata Airport is ЧЛА.

Cholpon-Ata Airport started its operations in the 1930s as a landing strip on the northern shore of Issyk-Kul Lake. The current runway and terminal were built in the 1970s. The runway has a weight limit of 22 tonnes, and has no instrument landing facilities and operates only during daylight hours.

Cholpon-Ata Airport is currently being replaced by Tamchy Airport. There are plans to reconstruct it as a VIP airport due to its proximity to the governmental resorts. Until 2003, Cholpon-Ata had regular links with Bishkek, Osh and Jalal-Abad.

References

External links
Ourairports.com

Airports in Kyrgyzstan
Airports built in the Soviet Union
Issyk-Kul Region